Tinkham is a surname. Notable people with the surname include:

Ernest Robert Tinkham (1904-1987), American entomologist
George H. Tinkham (1870–1956), American politician
Michael Tinkham (1928–2010), American physicist
Richard Tinkham, American basketball executive

See also
Tinkham Mountain, mountain in the Lewis Range, Montana, United States
Tinkham Peak, a mountain in the Cascade Range, Washington, United States